Glypthaga is a genus of longhorn beetles of the subfamily Lamiinae, containing the following species:

 Glypthaga lignosa Thomson, 1868
 Glypthaga mucorea Martins & Galileo, 1990
 Glypthaga nearnsi Martins & Galileo, 2008
 Glypthaga paupercula (Thomson, 1868)
 Glypthaga unicolor Martins & Galileo, 1990
 Glypthaga vicina Martins & Galileo, 1990
 Glypthaga xylina (Bates, 1865)

References

Onciderini